St Neots Priory was a Benedictine monastery beside the town of St Neots in the historic county of Huntingdonshire, now a non-metropolitan district in the English county of Cambridgeshire.

Anglo-Saxon monastery
A monastery was first founded here in about 974 by Earl Aelric (or Leofric) and his wife Aelfleda (or Ethelfleda), who granted it two hides of land, part of the manor of Eynesbury, later called the manor of St Neots. Its site is uncertain, though it may have been where the present parish church stands. It is said that the relics of the Cornish Saint Neot were obtained  from Neotstoke (now St Neot) in Cornwall and brought to the priory in order that it might have relics to attract pilgrims; hence the name of the town.

An Alien Priory of Bec Abbey
Saint Anselm, abbot of Bec Abbey in Normandy and later to be Archbishop of Canterbury, apparently visited the shrine of St Neot in 1078-9. In 1081 he sent eighteen monks from Bec to replace the Saxon monks, and had it re-founded by Richard Fitz Gilbert and his wife Rothais or Rohais, lords of the manor, as a male Benedictine priory dependent on Bec. In 1113 Rothais granted the whole manor of St Neots to the priory, which it held until its suppression.

The Anglo-Norman nobility gave considerable support to Bec Abbey, enriching it with extensive properties in England, where in addition to  St Neots, Bec possessed in the 15th century several priories, namely, Stoke-by-Clare, Wilsford,   Steventon, Cowick,  Ogbourne,  and at some point also Blakenham Priory and Povington Priory.  Among these  St Neots Priory was particularly large.  Bec also had  Goldcliff Priory in Monmouthshire.

The London suburb of Tooting Bec takes its name from the medieval village’s having been a possession of Bec Abbey.

At some point, quite possibly at the time of its re-foundation as a Benedictine priory, the monastery moved to a site on the riverside adjacent to a ford subsequently replaced by a bridge, a little way north of the present Market Square.

Because it was an alien priory (i.e., the dependency of a French mother-house) it suffered difficulties whenever there were hostilities between France and England, and particularly  during the Hundred Years' War. Its property was continually seized for this reason, until like certain other alien priories it was eventually given its independence from Bec in 1409 by the quasi-naturalisation process known as denization.

The Dissolution
The priory was finally seized during the  Dissolution of the Monasteries in 1539.

After the Dissolution of the Monasteries, the buildings were pulled down. The Dissolution commissioners had instructions to "pull down to the ground all the walls of the churches, stepulls, cloysters, fraterys, dorters, chapter howsys" and all the rest. The materials were then to be sold for the profit of the Crown.

Of the priory nothing now remains above ground, the last remaining structure, a gateway, having been  demolished in the late 18th century. A plaque marks the site.

Priors

Burials 
Richard fitz Gilbert, 1st Lord of Clare

External links 
 St. Neots Museum
 St. Neots Town Council

References

974 establishments
Anglo-Saxon monastic houses
Christian monasteries established in the 10th century
History of Huntingdonshire
Monasteries in Cambridgeshire
Benedictine monasteries in England
Alien priories in England
Order of Saint Benedict
Priory
10th-century establishments in England
1539 disestablishments in England